KDRI (830 AM, "The Drive") is a radio station in Tucson, Arizona. Owned by Tucson Radio, LLC, it broadcasts a soft oldies format. It is simulcast on FM translator K269FV at 101.7 MHz in Oro Valley.

KDRI is Arizona's only Primary Entry Point station to the Emergency Alert System.

History
A construction permit was issued in 1983 for a new station on 830 AM in Tucson to Doylan Forney. Forney had won the station, proposing to provide a middle-of-the-road music format "with an emphasis on spiritually enlightening programs", in a proceeding designed to promote ownership of radio stations by ethnic minorities. He first took the calls KGLY, then very soon after took the calls KGLR' when KGVY in Green Valley objected. In 1986, he sold the CP to Family Life Broadcasting, which had operated religious station KFLT at 1450 AM since 1977; Family Life then sold the 1450 frequency to another owner. On July 19, 1986, KFLT moved to the new 830, on the air for the first time with 50,000 watts. 1450 then KKPW "Power 1450" on the air. KFLT would be on 830 AM for another 33 years.

On August 1, 2019, KFLT was sold to Tucson Radio, LLC, owned by local businessman Fletcher McCusker, for $650,000; in 2018, Family Life Broadcasting had acquired KQTH from Scripps Media via Lotus Communications, which flipped to Family Life Radio as the de facto replacement for 830 KFLT. After stunting with novelty music as The Worm, it launched a soft oldies format with a Tucson-centric presentation and local personalities targeting "boomers in cars" as The Drive, KDRI, on August 5, 2019. Veteran radio executive and personality Bobby Rich joined the station as president of Tucson Radio, program director, and morning host.

References

External links

 
 

Radio stations established in 1986
DRI (AM)
Oldies radio stations in the United States
1986 establishments in Arizona